Mary Elwyn Patchett (2 December 1897 – 1989) was an Australian writer of children's literature, beautician and dietitian. She was considered to be a pioneer of children's science fiction and the most widely-read Australian children's author of the time. Patchett spent most of her life in England where both her beauty salon and authorial careers began.

Biography

Early life in Australia 
Patchett was born on 2 December 1897 in Sydney. She grew up on a cattle station near Texas, Queensland. She married Alan Barrington Hill in 1921 and moved to Warren, New South Wales where she experienced more rural life. Patchett left the bush in 1925 and worked as a journalist for five years for the Sun newspaper group. Whilst in Australia, Patchett studied diet, anatomy and massage under Elizabeth McMillan-Davidson. She also worked in a Sir Truby King mothercraft centre.

Beauty salons in London 

Patchett left for London in 1931, originally only planning to stay there for six months. Patchett began her career in London by freelance writing until she could no longer do outdoor newspaper work due to an illness. Patchett was offered a job in a beauty parlour where she was shown a special technique based on muscular manipulation. By this point she was remarried to her husband Stanser Patchett from Melbourne. Once her husband became ill, Patchett travel to sanatoriums around Europe for treatment. On these travels Patchett learnt more about muscle manipulation treatments. She studied in Paris where she gained an orthodox diploma and enrolled on diploma course at the Helen Pessel school in Vienna 1935.

Back in London, Patchett opened a beauty parlour in Clarges Street, Mayfair then moved to Clifford Street in 1936. Among other high-profile patrons she became in charge of beauty treatments for Lady Titchbourne. Patchett designed a diet chart and provided a combination of muscular treatment with practical advice on diet and exercise. She also published articles on beauty tips.

Patchett fought for a common standard for beauty specialists, concerned about people providing temporary improvements which could do permanent harm. This led to her opening a school of beauty culture with four students at a time. She became known as one of the leading beauty specialists and dietitians in London.

World War II 
During World War II Patchett worked as a wartime censor. She was stationed in Gibraltar where she was tasked with introducing Press censorship. Later, Patchett became the head of Press censorship in Bermuda where her husband died in 1939. Patchett stated she did not enjoy the job but it kept her alive "for many years." She worked in Bermuda until a foot injury forced her to retire from the job, then worked in censorship in Trinidad.

Career as author 
During her time working in beauty salons in London, Patchett also wrote short stories on the side. After the War she travelled back to England via Canada.

Patchett started writing books because she needed money, and around 1949–1950 she decided to commit to children's writing full-time. Her first book, Ajax the Warrior (based on Patchett's dog, also called Ajax) was published in 1953 and was originally broadcast in 1952 for BBC Children's Hour. It inspired a long series of adventure stories from Patchett with animal characters and bush settings. In 1953, 500 copies of Ajax the Warrior were sold for use in Australian schools alone and a copy of the book was ordered for Buckingham Palace.

In 1954, copy of The Sunburnt Country, a profile of Australia written by Australian writers in England, was given to The Queen and The Duke of Edinburgh as a helpful guide for their tour of the country. Patchett wrote the chapter As Nature Left It, describing homestead life including depictions of platypuses and kookaburras.

Many of Patchett's early books were science fiction and were written under the pseudonym M. E. Patchett. Patchett claimed she used this gender non-specific pseudonym "because boys don't like books written by women." She was keen to research the subject of her books, which led her to join British Interplanetary Society stating "I was determined not to write fool stuff in this field, so I decided to learn all I could about outer space and go on from there." At the time she was only one of three women to have been admitted to the Society.

Patchett was passionate about animals and worked this into her writing, stating that she "gets animals the way other people get jaundice". She wrote about her experience with mice and snake plagues whilst living in Warren, which inspired her novel Call of the Heart. Whilst working in Trinidad, she kept a centipede and rescued an anteater. She looked after it for a while before handing it over to a zoo. In England, she became an expert on falconry.

Bibliography

Collections 
 BBC Children's Hour Annual
 Look and Learn
 Chucklers Annual
 A Bumper Book of Girls' Stories

Awards 
Wild Brother was named book of the month by John O'London's. It was also Highly Commended CBCA Book of the Year in 1955.

References

External links 
Mary Elwyn Patchett bibliography via austlit.edu.au
Mary Patchett interviewed by Hazel de Berg, National Library of Australia (sound archive)

1897 births
1989 deaths
20th-century Australian women writers
20th-century Australian writers
Australian children's writers
Beauticians
Writers from Sydney